Gabriel Bibron (20 October 1805 – 27 March 1848) was a French zoologist and herpetologist. He was born in Paris. The son of an employee of the Museum national d'histoire naturelle, he had a good foundation in natural history and was hired to collect vertebrates in Italy and Sicily. Under the direction of Jean Baptiste Bory de Saint-Vincent (1778–1846), he took part in the Morea expedition to Peloponnese.

He classified numerous reptile species with André Marie Constant Duméril (1774–1860), whom he had met in 1832. Duméril was interested mainly in the relations between genera, and he left to Bibron the task of describing the species. Working together they produced the Erpétologie Générale, a comprehensive account of the reptiles, published in ten volumes from 1834 to 1854. Also, Bibron assisted Duméril with teaching duties at the museum and was an instructor at a primary school in Paris.

Bibron contracted tuberculosis and retired in 1845 to Saint-Alban-les-Eaux, where he died at the age of 42.

Taxa named in honor of Bibron
Bibron is commemorated in the scientific names of ten species of reptiles.
Afrotyphlops bibronii, a blind snake
Atractaspis bibroni, a venomous snake
Calliophis bibroni, a venomous snake
Candoia bibroni, a boa
Chondrodactylus bibronii, a gecko
Diplolaemus bibronii, a lizard
Enyalius bibronii, a lizard
Eutropis bibronii, a skink
Liolaemus bibronii, a lizard
Pelochelys bibroni, a turtle

An eleventh species, which was more commonly known as Agama impalearis, had been named Agama bibronii by André Marie Constant Duméril in 1851, however a decision by the ICZN in 1971 confirmed that the correct name was A. bibroni.

References

External links
SSARHerps (biography).

1805 births
1848 deaths
French zoologists
French herpetologists
National Museum of Natural History (France) people
Scientists from Paris
Tuberculosis deaths in France
19th-century deaths from tuberculosis